Minnette Ella Gersh Lenier (July 9, 1945 in Atlanta, Georgia – February 7, 2011 in Woodland Hills, Los Angeles, California) was a teacher and professional magician who used stage magic to improve students' reading and learning skills.

Education and career
Minnette Lenier received a Bachelor of Arts in 1967 from San Fernando Valley State College, and was a Graduate Student at the University of Southern California. She received a Master of Arts in 1968 from the University of Iowa, and a PhD in 1971 from the University of Southern California, with a thesis entitled Theodore Roosevelt's Communication Strategies In The Presidential Campaign Of 1912. As a reading specialist, Lenier worked with students at Compton Community College and at other Southeast Los Angeles area schools, as well as in the Los Angeles Unified School District. Lenier was on the faculty of Los Angeles Pierce College.

Magician
Lenier began taking magic lessons in 1966 with the magician Jules Lenier (1929–2007), whom she later married. She performed professionally, often at the Magic Castle, earned over half her living through magic, and had the distinction of being one of the few female performing magicians.

Teaching literacy
Minnette Lenier used stage magic in the classroom to elevate student interest in the subject matter and worked mostly with remedial reading students. Lenier's stage magic, a concrete task, showed students that everyone has perceptual difficulties at times and that misperception can even bring enjoyment. Lenier gave optical illusions to everyone in class to examine, and would then discuss how people are fooled in general, and how the problems students have in reading could be solved. Lenier proved to students that to be fooled is not to be stupid. She allowed students to bring the illusions home so they could try them on other people to demonstrate that everyone is occasionally deceived by their eyes. Lenier noted that this also gives students the opportunity to be successful with others because they have the correct answers to the illusions. Lenier used magic not only with remedial students, but with gifted students as well. These students are often bored in their classes and Lenier discovered that learning magic is a mind-expanding activity for them.

Minnette Lenier died suddenly of cardiac arrest in her home in Woodland Hills, California on February 7, 2011.

Bibliography
 (with Janet Maker)
 (with Janet Maker)
 (with Janet Maker)
 (with Janet Maker)

References

1945 births
2011 deaths
Schoolteachers from California
American women educators
People from Los Angeles
American magicians
University of Southern California alumni
California State University, Northridge alumni
University of Iowa alumni
Los Angeles Pierce College people
21st-century American women